Rumbeke is a town in the Belgian municipality of Roeselare in the province of West Flanders. It is most known as the location of Rumbeke Castle.

References 

Populated places in West Flanders
Roeselare